The Oprah Winfrey Charitable Foundation (formally  The Oprah Winfrey Leadership Academy Foundation) is a tax-deductible charity with  total assets of US$172 million. In 2006, Winfrey added US$36 million of her own money to the Foundation.

In 2020, the foundation donated US$10 million to COVID-19 relief efforts: money will go feed those most impacted by the coronavirus epidemic in America, including children who rely on school lunch programs, low-income families, the elderly, and individuals facing job disruptions.

References

See also
Harpo Productions
Oprah Winfrey Leadership Academy for Girls
Beauty Check

Foundations based in the United States
Foundation
Foreign charities operating in South Africa